Can It Be? is the second album recorded by Jesus music band The Way, released in 1975 on Maranatha! Records.

Track listing

Personnel
The Way
 John Wickham – lead guitar, bass, acoustic guitar, background vocals
 Gary Arthur – bass guitar, acoustic guitar, synthesizer, background vocals
 Alex MacDougall – drums, congas and timbales, percussion
 Dana Angle – lead and slide guitar, banjo, acoustic guitar & vocals
 Bruce Herring – acoustic guitar, bass, vocals

Additional personnel
 Al Perkins – producer, mixing, pedal steel guitar on "A Cowboy's Dream"
 Bill Taylor – engineer, mixing
 Mama Jo's, North Hollywood, California – recording location
 Bernie Grundman – mastering
 Dave Diggs – string arrangements on "Bearded Young Man"
 Michael Excalente – keyboards except on "A Cowboy's Dream"
 Dave Diggs – keyboards on "A Cowboy's Dream"
 Don Dixon – front cover airbrush
 Daniel Agulian – inside photo
 Dana Angle – album concept
 Neal Buchanan – design and artwork
Note: special thanks to Jesus Christ our Lord

References
 
 
 Can it Be?. 1975 Maranatha! Music. HS 777/16

1975 albums